Jean-Denis Bredin (born Jean-Denis Hirsch:  17 May 1929 – 1 September 2021) was a French attorney and founding partner of the firm Bredin Prat.   He was widely admired as an author-commentator, both for his novels and for his non-fiction works, with a particular focus on recent and contemporary history.  On 15 June 1989, he was elected to membership of the Académie Française, becoming the twentieth occupant of seat 3, which had been vacated through the death of Marguerite Yourcenar.  His daughter, Frédérique Bredin, served between 2013 and 2019 as President of the French National Center of Cinematography and the moving image.

Bredin died on 1 September 2021 aged 92.

Bibliography 
 Traité de droit du commerce international, en collaboration avec le doyen Loussouarn – Sirey – 1969
 La République de Monsieur Pompidou – Julliard – 1974
 Les Français au pouvoir – Grasset – 1977
 Éclats, en collaboration avec Jack Lang et Antoine Vitez – Simoën – 1978
 Joseph Caillaux – Hachette Littérature – 1980
 Rapport de la mission de réflexion et de propositions sur le cinéma, rapport au ministre de la Culture – 1981
 L’Affaire – Julliard – 1983
 Rapport de la mission sur l’enseignement des métiers du cinéma et de l’audiovisuel, rapport aux ministres de l’Éducation nationale, de la Culture et de l’Industrie – 1984
 Un coupable – Gallimard – 1985
 Les Nouvelles Télévisions hertziennes, rapport au Premier ministre – La Documentation française – 1985
 L’Absence – Gallimard – 1986
 La Tâche – Gallimard – 1988
 Sieyès – Le Fallois – 1989
 Un enfant sage – Gallimard – 1990
 Battements de cœur – Fayard – 1991
 Bernard Lazare – Le Fallois – 1992
 L’Affaire, nouvelle édition refondue – Fayard-Julliard – 1993
 Comédie des apparences – Odile Jacob – 1994
 Encore un peu de temps – Gallimard – 1996
 Convaincre, Dialogue sur l’éloquence, en collaboration avec Thierry Lévy – Odile Jacob – 1997
 Une singulière famille – Fayard – 1999
 Rien ne va plus – Fayard – 2000
 Lettre à Dieu le Fils – Grasset – 2001
 Un tribunal au garde-à-vous. Le procès de Pierre Mendès-France, 9 mai 1941 – Fayard – 2002
 Et des amours desquelles nous parlons – Fayard – 2004
 Mots et pas perdus – Plon – 2005
 On ne meurt qu'une fois, Charlotte Corday – Fayard – 2006
L'infamie: Le procès de Riom – Grasset – 2012
 The Affair: The Case of Alfred Dreyfus - newly edited and translated – Plunkett Lake Press-George Braziller – 2014

References 

 

1929 births
2021 deaths
Writers from Paris
Members of the Académie Française
French male writers
French people of Jewish descent
20th-century French lawyers
21st-century French lawyers